Cars on the Road is an American computer-animated streaming television series of shorts produced by Pixar Animation Studios for the Disney+ streaming service and based on the Cars franchise. The main cast includes Owen Wilson as Lightning McQueen and Larry the Cable Guy as Mater. The series is written by Steve Purcell and produced by Marc Sondheimer. Set after the events of Cars 3 (2017), Cars on the Road follows Lightning (Wilson) and Mater (Cable Guy) as they embark on a road trip to attend the wedding of Mater's sister, visiting various locations and characters along the way.

The series was announced in December 2020, during Disney's Investor Day. Sondheimer says the directors worked together to maintain continuity within the series. The title was revealed in November 2021, during Pixar's special for 2021's Disney+ Day. Concepts for the episodes include stories which pay homage to films such as Mad Max (1979) and The Shining (1980). The production designer altered the lighting to further evoke Ray Harryhausen's films. Production for the series took place over 15 months. 

Cars on the Road premiered on September 8, 2022, as part of Disney+ Day. The series received positive reviews for its vocal performance, messages, humor, role models and homage to pop culture.

Premise
Sometime after the events of Cars 3 (2017), Lightning McQueen and his best friend Mater embark on a cross-country road trip around the United States to attend the wedding of Mater's sister, Mato. Along the way, they come across various locations and characters old and new.

Voice cast

Owen Wilson as Lightning McQueen
Larry the Cable Guy as Mater
Quinta Brunson as Ivy
Cristela Alonzo as Cruz Ramirez
Dana Powell as Mato
Oscar Camacho as Mateo
Bonnie Hunt as Sally Carrera
Jenifer Lewis as Flo
Cheech Marin as Ramone
Lloyd Sherr as Fillmore
Tony Shalhoub as Luigi
Guido Quaroni as Guido
Tania Gunadi as Lisa
Ruth Livier as Louise
Steve Purcell as Randy / Wraith Rod
Matt Yang King as Clutch Humboldt / Wraith Rod / Crew Pitty
Kathy Holly as Speed Demon
Masa Kansome as Noriyuki
Toks Olagundoye as Margaret Motorray / Chiefess
Gabby Sanalitro as Griswold
Megan Cavanagh as Mae Pillar-Durev / Bella Cadavre
Hayden Bishop as Kay Pillar-Durev / 1st AD
Secunda Wood as Brakelight Pictures' producer
Matt Lowe as Brakelight Pictures' crew members
Zeno Robinson as Lance the Writer / Jeremy
Dave Fennoy as Town Marshall / Justice Stern
Tom Bromhead as Cap'n Long Leggy
Debra Cardona as Squat

Red, Mack, Sheriff, Sarge and Lizzie make silent cameos in "Dino Park".

Episodes

Production

Development 

On December 10, 2020, Pixar announced on Disney Investors Day that an animated series starring Lightning McQueen and Mater traveling the country while meeting friends, new and old, was in development and that it would be released on Disney+ in the fall of 2022. It also announced that the series is written by Steve Purcell and produced by Marc Sondheimer, with Purcell, Bobby Podesta and Cars 3 director Brian Fee directing episodes for the series. According to Sondheimer, the directors worked together to maintain continuity within the series. On November 12, 2021, it was announced that the series would be titled Cars on the Road. Production for the series took place over 15 months.

Writing 
The filmmakers wanted a short-form series because they felt it was the best way to explore the concept of a road trip, while also exploring the relationship between McQueen and Mater, as the producers felt the characters lacked screentime together. Each episode features a different tone and genre. The concept for the series was suggested by Purcell as the producers brainstormed ideas, having been inspired by a childhood road trip he took with his family; he wanted to explore how McQueen and Mater react to finding themselves in different scenarios. According to Purcell, the story for each episode was decided out of a basic scenario, after which the filmmakers pitched concepts that fit within the Cars world and had not been explored before. Concepts for the episodes include stories inspired by films such as Mad Max and The Shining. For Mater's relationship with his sister, Mato, Podesta drew inspiration from his relationship with his sisters.

Casting 
On November 12, 2021, it was announced that Owen Wilson and Larry the Cable Guy would reprise their respective roles as Lightning McQueen and Mater. According to director Brian Fee, Larry and Wilson were allowed to provide suggestions while recording their lines.

Animation 
One of the episodes features a flashback sequence to the prehistoric era. For the flashback, animators were inspired by the work of stop-motion animator Ray Harryhausen, whose films Purcell watched in his childhood. For both the dinosaurs' movement and when McQueen and Mater's prehistoric counterparts are picked by the dinosaurs, animators deactivated the motion blur, which they did use for the rest of the sequence, to reflect the feeling of Harryhausen's films. The production designer also altered the lighting to further evoke his films. Other elements such as frames were also altered.

Music 
Following the trailer's release, it was revealed Jake Monaco composed the score for all nine episodes. Monaco also co-wrote the series' title theme song alongside director Bobby Podesta, with Bobby Hamrick performing the song. Each episode features a variation of the theme song to reflecting its style. The soundtrack, featuring Monaco's score and four songs, including two versions of the theme, was released on September 5, 2022.

Release
Cars on the Road premiered on September 8, 2022 on Disney+, part of Disney+ Day and consists of nine episodes.

Marketing
The official trailer was released by Pixar’s YouTube channel on August 1, 2022. To promote the series' release, McDonald's launched its promotional campaign by including one of eight toys free with the purchase of a Happy Meal.

Reception

Critical reception 
On the review aggregator website Rotten Tomatoes, the series holds a 92% approval rating, with an average rating of 7.00/10 based on 11 reviews.

Joel Keller of Decider found the series to be a classic buddy road trip, praising the humor and the way the show parodies pop culture, while applauding the performances of the voice actors, citing the dynamic between Owen Wilson and Larry the Cable Guy. Polly Conway of Common Sense Media rated the series 4 out of 5 stars, praised the depiction of positive messages and role models, citing friendship and discovery, while finding the series entertaining across its humor and family-friendly.  Randy Myers of The Mercury News gave the series 3 out of 4 stars, called the setup simple yet efficient and found the series joyful and entertaining, stating it succeeds to celebrate friendship across the characters, while acknowledging the references to pop culture.

Accolades 
Christopher Foreman, Elana Lederman, John Lockwood, Jae Jun Yi, Justin Ritter were nominated for the short "Road Rumblers" for the category Outstanding Achievement for Animated Effects in an Animated Television/Broadcast Production at the 50th Annie Awards.

References

External links

2020s American animated television series
2022 American television series debuts
American children's animated comedy television series
American children's animated sports television series
American computer-animated television series
American sequel television series
Animated television series about auto racing
Television shows set in the United States
Animated television shows based on films
Cars (franchise)
Disney animated television series
Disney+ original programming
English-language television shows
Television series based on Disney films
Television series by Pixar